The 1986 France rugby union tour of Argentina, Australia and New Zealand was a series of eight matches played by French national rugby union team touring those countries between May and June 1986.

For the first time, a test match played by Argentina was arranged at the José Amalfitani Stadium, the ground of football team Vélez Sarsfield.

Matches
 Test matches

References

France tour
1986
Rugby union tours of Argentina
Rugby union tours of New Zealand
Rugby union tours of Australia
France national rugby union team tours
tour
f
rugby